Iordan is, most of the time, a Romanian surname, but it is also used as a given name:

Surname 
 Andrei Iordan
 Iorgu Iordan
 Veaceslav Iordan
 Valeriy Iordan

Given name 
 Iordan Chimet

See also 
 Jordan (name)
 Iordana River

Romanian masculine given names
Romanian-language surnames